Meitei (Manipuri language), a Tibeto-Burman language of Manipur, India, is an archive of numerous epic poetry as well as epic prose.

Lists

Here is a list of the epics in Meitei literature:

References 

Meitei language
Meitei literature
Meitei language-related lists
Manipur-related lists